Robert Ludlum (1927–2001) was an American author of twenty-seven novels between 1971 and 2006, the last being issued five years after his death. Of his twenty-seven novels, two were originally published under the pseudonym of Jonathan Ryder and another under the pseudonym of Michael Shepherd. Ludlum also created the Covert-One series, overseeing the first three novels with Gayle Lynds and Philip Shelby before his death. Following Ludlum's death, his estate has continued to publish novels under his name with eleven authors having written a combined thirty novels under the Ludlum brand, a trademark inscription of "Robert Ludlum's" on every book (e.g. Robert Ludlum's The Bourne Dominion). Since 2019, publishing rights in the United States have been held by G. P. Putnam's Sons, taking over from Grand Central Publishing who held the rights from 2007 to 2017.

The latest book to be published is The Blackbriar Genesis by Simon Gervais. The Treadstone Rendition by Joshua Hood is scheduled for April 2023, The Bourne Defiance by Brian Freeman is set for July 2023 and The Blackbriar Deceit by Simon Gervais is scheduled for October 2023.



Works

Works by other authors based on the author's characters

References

External links
Official Robert Ludlum website

Bibliographies by writer
Bibliography